Tom Curren is an American surfer and musician.

Professional career
By the time Curren joined the ASP World Tour in 1983, he was competing with professionals such as Rabbit Bartholomew, Shaun Tomson, and Cheyne Horan.

He was world champion in 1985, 1986, and 1990, and won 33 championship events in his professional career, the latter being a total only bettered by Kelly Slater. He achieved notoriety for his competitive drive and for his surfing style. He had made a decision to retire from competitive surfing in the mid-1990s.

In 1990, at Margaret River, Curren rode a wave all the way from the take-off zone to the Rivermouth, roughly a 1200-foot ride. He then had to walk back to Mainbreak from the Rivermouth to re-enter the surf. Those who saw it say it has never been repeated, in or out of competition.

Curren still surfs in contests on the ASP World Qualifying Series (WQS.) He is also often invited to surf in World Championship Tour (WCT) trials or contests as a wildcard. He has competed in the Annual Switchfoot Bro-Am Surf Contest for 3 years in a row, surfing on the Switchfoot team.

In his five-year rise to World Surfing Champion, Curren appeared under a contract with surfboard company Channel Islands. He co-produced and rode pro surfboard models such as the Black Beauty and the Red Beauty.

Early in his professional career, he signed with OP swimwear then later changed sponsorships deals to Rip Curl Wetsuits and Clothing.

The Fish Revolution
After his hiatus, Curren temporarily re-appeared at an ASP Surfing Competition in France in 1993, armed with a 1970s 5'5" Twin Fin he'd reportedly bought second hand in a New Jersey Surf Shop (Surfers Supplies in Ocean City, NJ). He entered and proceeded to beat Matt Hoy, who was ranked eighth in the world at the time. Curren showed the world how to use the fish board and how to use it with a modern style of surfing. Curren has collaborated on retro fish and egg designs with surfcraft design engineer and fellow Santa Barbaran George Greenough.

Video game appearances
Curren is a playable character in the video game Kelly Slater's Pro Surfer.

References

1964 births
American surfers
World Surf League surfers
American multi-instrumentalists
Living people
Sportspeople from Santa Barbara, California